Lab 4 is a U.K. based hard trance act that was formed in 1994 by Adam Newman and Lez Elston.

Newman and Elston had previously worked together in the industrial act M.A.D. Shortly after forming, the duo were asked to perform at Club UK, a nightclub that had previously played host to DJs such as Carl Cox and Laurent Garnier. They later played at London fetish club Torture Garden and have since played at the Brixton Academy, Global Gathering 2005 and at Infest in 2006.

Lab 4 were regularly played on Radio 1 by John Peel who also invited Lab 4 to launch their third album Virus on one of his 'John Peel Session' at Maida Vale.

Lab 4's track "Born In The Sky" (vocal by Les Elston) also appeared on the Reebok television advert for their DMX trainer. This was amongst many other 'music to picture' assignments.

Lab4 have also worked on many high-profile advertising campaign for the likes of Bacardi, Reebok (Super Bowl), Pepsi, BBC, Coca-Cola and Auto Modellista by Capcom.

In September 2006 a statement was posted on the Lab 4 website that Lab 4 would be disbanding at the end of 2006.

Lab4 are currently working on a new album for 2014 which will see collaboration with the likes of Chris Jones and Eller Van Buuren, Armada, PVD.

In November 2013 Lab4 also secured their first major motion picture track placement for the upcoming Sci Fi Movie “Time Lapse” starring John Rhys-Davies (Lord Of The Rings), Danielle Panabaker (Mad Men, 90210) Dir: Bradley King.

As of 2015 Lab 4 were again touring the UK at various dance events.

Discography
 Neurocide (LP, 1999, Trebleate Recordings)
 Evilution (LP, 2000, One Inch Records)
 Devilution (LP, 2001, Fragile)
 Yoji Biomehanika Presents Lab 4 In the Mix (LP, 2001, Superb Trax)
 Devilution 2 (LP, 2002, Fragile)
 Evilution (LP, 2002, Superb Trax)
 Virus (LP, 2002, Tidy Trax)
 Laboratory 31.03.02 - Experiment 1 (LP, 2003, Fragile) (recorded at Camden Palace)
 Devilution 3 (LP, 2004, Fragile)
 Laboratory 04.04.04 - Experiment 2 (LP, 2004, Fragile) (recorded at Shepherd's Bush Empire)
 None Of Us Are Saints (LP, 2006, Avex Trax)
 The Tidy Magna Live Album (LP, 2009, Tidy Trax) (CD 1 is Lab 4, CD 2 Agnelli & Nelson, CD 3 Rob Tissera)

References

External links

 lab4.com
 adamlab4.com
 djxlab4.com - site for Lez Elston's solo hard dance project

British dance music groups